In the Hall of the Mountain King is an 1875 orchestral piece composed by Edvard Grieg.

In the Hall of the Mountain King or Hall of the Mountain King may also refer to:

Geography
 Hall of the Mountain King, the largest chamber in the Ogof Craig a Ffynnon cave system in Wales
 Hall of the Mountain King, a cliff structure found at Bryce Canyon National Park in southwest Utah

Books
 In the Hall of the Mountain King, a story by John Varley (author)
 Hall of the Mountain King, a novel by Judith Tarr

Film and TV
 La Maldicion de la Bestia, also known as Hall of the Mountain King, a 1975 Spanish horror movie

Music
 Hall of the Mountain King, the title and title track of a 1987 album by Savatage

See also
 Hall of the Mountain Grill, a 1974 album by Hawkwind